Have You Met This Jones? is an album by pianist Hank Jones recorded in Germany in 1977 for the MPS label and released in 1978.

Reception

Allmusic awarded the album 3 stars.

Track listing
 "There's a Small Hotel" (Richard Rodgers, Lorenz Hart) - 5:06
 "Portions" (Thad Jones) - 7:40
 "The Oregon Grinder" (Jerry Dodgion) - 4:27 		
 "I Got It Bad and That Ain't Good" (Duke Ellington) - 5:16
 "We're All Together" (Hank Jones) - 5:49
 "Like Someone in Love" (Jimmy Van Heusen, Johnny Burke) - 4:37 		
 "Now's the Time" (Charlie Parker) - 5:22
 "Robbins Nest" (Illinois Jacquet, Charles Thompson) - 6:27

Personnel 
Hank Jones - piano
Isla Eckinger - bass
Kurt Bong - drums

References 

1978 albums
Hank Jones albums
MPS Records albums